The White Pass School District is a school located in East    Lewis County, Washington.                         It serves the communities of Packwood, Randle, and Glenoma which are located along US Highway 12.   The district currently has a student population of around 500 students.   The district and schools are named after the mountain pass over the crest of the Cascade Mountains, located at the east end of the district.

Schools

Current school buildings 

 White Pass Jr./Sr. High (7-12th grade) 
516 Silverbrook Rd.
Randle, WA 98377
Mascot - Panthers/Timberwolves
 White Pass Elementary (Preschool-6th grade), formerly Randle Elementary
127 Kindle Rd.
Randle, WA 98377
Mascot - Panther Cubs

Former school buildings 

 Packwood Elementary
Mascot - Warriors
 Randle Elementary
Mascot - Tigers
 Glenoma Elementary
Mascot - Wildcats

Athletics 

Since 2010, White Pass High School has joined all its athletic programs with neighboring Morton High School in the WIAA 2B classification as the Morton/White Pass Timberwolves. Prior to 2009, White Pass competed independently in the 2B/1A classifications as the White Pass Panthers.

The Morton/White Pass Timberwolves compete in interscholastic competitions throughout the school year, including

Fall Sports
 Football
 Cross Country
 Volleyball

Winter Sports
 Boys Basketball
 Girls Basketball

Spring Sports
 Track and Field
 Boys Baseball
 Girls Fastpitch Softball

Academic
 Knowledge Bowl

2004 school closures 

Due to loss of timber industry and Forest Service jobs, the school-age population of the entire White Pass School district has declined significantly from its high in the 1970s, especially from the mid-1990s-2000s. By 2004, the Packwood and Glenoma Elementary Schools' K-6 enrollments dropped to around 50 students each, resulting in the closure of the Packwood and Glenoma schools. Since 2004, all students in the district are now taught at the Elementary/High School campus in Randle.

Construction 

In 2009, construction began on a new high school as a replacement for the aging cinder block building. Construction was completed on the new high school in summer, 2010, and junior high and high school classes and athletics occupied the new facility beginning Fall, 2010. Thereafter, a complete gutting and remodel of the old elementary school began, with elementary classes occupying the old high school building for the 2010-2011 school year.  
Currently the Elementary School resides next to the present Jr/Sr High School and district offices.  Due to rising attendance in the Junior High grades, the district may be looking into various ways to reduce class size and improve mobility within the school for junior high and high school students alike.

Notable alumni 

 Scott Carnahan (1969) - Baseball Coach and Athletic Director, Linfield College; Assistant coach/business manager, 1996 US Olympic baseball team
 Michael Moodenbaugh - theme park owner/developer
 Darrell Davis, Professor and Chair of Medicinal Chemistry and Adjunct Professor of Biochemistry, University of Utah
 Kenneth Brown (1994) - Professor of Electrical and Computer Engineering, Physics, and Chemistry, Duke University
 Eric Blanton (2000) - Nationally recognized AA and AAA  Minor League Baseball turf manager

References

External links
  District page
  Grade School
  High School

School districts in Washington (state)
Education in Lewis County, Washington